Kevin Clarke may refer to:

Kevin Clarke (Irish footballer) (1921–1990), Irish soccer player
Kevin Clarke (politician), candidate for public office in Toronto, Ontario, Canada
Kevin Clarke (writer), English writer
Kevin Clarke (music historian) (born 1967), Irish-German music historian
Kevin Clarke (footballer, born 1931) (1931–2009), Australian rules footballer for Melbourne and Carlton
Kevin Clarke (footballer, born 1932) (1932–1993), Australian rules footballer for Collingwood

See also
Kevin Clark (disambiguation)